Kawinda Toi is a village in Tambora District, Bima Regency in West Nusa Tenggara Province. Its population is 1058.

Climate
Kawinda Toi has a subtropical highland climate (Cfb). It has moderate to heavy rainfall from May to October and very heavy to extremely heavy rainfall from November to April.

References

West Nusa Tenggara
Villages in Indonesia